Park Sung-hyun (born 21 September 1993), also known as Sung Hyun Park, is a South Korean professional golfer playing on the U.S.-based LPGA Tour. She has won two LPGA majors championships, the 2017 U.S. Women's Open and the 2018 Women's PGA Championship. She was the number one ranked golfer in the Women's World Golf Rankings for a single week in 2017 and has returned to the number one spot in 2018 and 2019.

Professional career
From 2014 to 2016 Park played on the LPGA of Korea Tour. She won four times in 2015 and six times in 2016.

Since 2017 Park has played on the LPGA Tour. In July 2017, she won the U.S. Women's Open, an LPGA major. In November 2017, she became the number one ranked golfer in the Women's World Golf Rankings. Park clinched the LPGA's Rookie of the Year Award in the penultimate month of the 2017 season. Park then went on to share Player of the Year honors with Ryu So-yeon, making Park the first player since Nancy Lopez in 1978 to win both Player and Rookie of the Year honors in the same season.

Park won three times in 2018, this included a major title in July 2018 at the KPMG Women's PGA Championship. After holding the top ranking for only one week in 2017, she regained the number one spot with her win at the Indy Women in Tech Championship in August 2018. She ended the 2018 season third on the LPGA money list and ranked second in the world to Ariya Jutanugarn.

In 2019, Park won the HSBC Women's World Championship and the Walmart NW Arkansas Championship.

Professional wins (18)

LPGA Tour wins (7)

LPGA Tour playoff record (2–0)

LPGA of Korea Tour wins (10)

Taiwan LPGA Tour wins (1)
2019 The Country Club Ladies Invitational

Major championships

Wins (2)

Results timeline
Results not in chronological order before 2019 or in 2020.

CUT = missed the half-way cut
NT = no tournament
T = tied

Summary

 Most consecutive cuts made – 10 (2016 ANA – 2018 ANA)
 Longest streak of top 10s – 3 (2019 Women's PGA – 2019 British Open)

LPGA Tour career summary

 official as of 2022 season

Team appearances
Professional
The Queens (representing Korea): 2015 (winners)
International Crown (representing South Korea): 2018 (winners)

References

External links

Park Sung-hyun at the KLPGA Tour official site 

Profile on Seoul Sisters site

South Korean female golfers
LPGA Tour golfers
LPGA of Korea Tour golfers
Winners of LPGA major golf championships
Golfers from Orlando, Florida
Golfers from Seoul
1993 births
Living people